Philippine Airlines is composed of wide-body and narrow-body aircraft from five families (including PAL Express fleet): Airbus A320ceo family, Airbus A321neo, Airbus A330, Airbus A350, and Boeing 777. This article shows the fleet operated by the main airline excluding aircraft operated by PAL Express.

Current fleet
, Philippine Airlines operates the following aircraft:

Aircraft types

Airbus A321

The Airbus A321 is the main aircraft utilized for short-haul and medium-haul flights that serve Southeast and East Asia such as Hong Kong, Singapore, Bangkok, and Kuala Lumpur, as well as major domestic destinations including Cebu and Davao. On August 28, 2012, Philippine Airlines ordered 34 Airbus A321-200 equipped with IAE V2500 engines, but was later reduced to 24. The first A321 was delivered on August 7, 2013.

Airbus A321neo

On August 28, 2012, Philippine Airlines ordered 10 Airbus A321neos equipped with two Pratt & Whitney PW1000G engines. The airline, in total, ordered 44 A321s of both the current (CEO) and new engine option (NEO) variants.

On March 29, 2015, the airline announced that it will be receiving the A321neo starting 2017. However, the deliveries were delayed to May 2018 due to problems with the Pratt & Whitney engines. PAL received its first A321neo (new engine option) on June 1, 2018, while the other five A321neos were delivered until December 2018. The remaining fifteen A321neos in the SR variant, on the other hand, will be delivered in the following years. However, PAL only received two A321neo SRs in 2019 as the airline revises its re-fleeting plan.

The first six Airbus A321neos serve the airline's medium-haul and long-haul routes such as Guam, Singapore, Tokyo, Ho Chi Minh City, Sapporo, Brisbane and Sydney, while the other SR variants will be serving short-haul regional routes in Southeast Asia and other neighboring countries.

Airbus A330

The Airbus A330-300 is primarily deployed in Asia and Oceania routes. They are also deployed in US territories like Honolulu and Guam and domestic destinations such as General Santos, Cebu and Davao.

Philippine Airlines introduced their first Airbus A330-300 on July 30, 1997, with the delivery of the first aircraft, F-OHZM. Philippine Airlines later acquired eight Airbus A330-300s as replacement for their aging Airbus A300B4 fleet's gradual retirement. On August 28, 2012, Philippine Airlines ordered 10 new Airbus Airbus A330-300s, but the airline later expanded its orders to 20 on October 1.

The airline received its first A330-300 High Gross Variant (HGW) in September 2013. The newer A330s use a pair of Rolls-Royce Trent 700 engines, unlike the older General Electric CF6 engines that powered the earlier A330 fleet. The original fleet of eight A330s were transferred to PAL Express until these were retired on August 31, 2014.

Airbus A350

The Airbus A350-900 is primarily deployed in the airline's long-haul flights to cities such as New York, Toronto, London, and Vancouver. The A350s are also used in regional Asian flights during peak seasons or when there is high demand in destinations such as Seoul, Bangkok, Hong Kong, Sydney, Singapore, and Tokyo. PAL's A350s have a maximum takeoff weight (MTOW) of 278 tonnes, enabling non-stop Manila-New York flights without payload limitations in either direction, a  flight which began in October 2018.

In April 2016, Philippine Airlines finalized the purchase agreement with Airbus covering the firm order of six A350-900s. The contract firms up a memorandum of understanding announced during the 2016 Singapore Airshow in February 2016. The A350-900s, which will have a three-class configuration, are scheduled to be deployed on new routes to North America and Europe. The A350-900s also replaced the aging Airbus A340-300s that serves North America and Asia.

In February 2018, Jaime Bautista, then-president of the airline, stated that they were also interested in the larger Airbus A350-1000 variant.

On July 14, 2018, PAL received its first A350-900. In February 2019, Philippine Airlines took delivery of their fifth A350 with the iconic Love Bus decal to mark the 40th anniversary of their partnership with Airbus.

Boeing 777

The Boeing 777-300ER is primarily used for long-haul flights to Los Angeles, San Francisco, Vancouver and Toronto. It was also used for service to London, and New York, but was later replaced by the A350-900. They are sometimes deployed in Asian and Australian routes as well if the demand needs it.

On March 12, 2007, Philippine Airlines finalized the purchase agreement with Boeing covering the firm order of two Boeing 777-300ERs. It ordered two more three months later. The purchase of Boeing 777s effectively signalled the end of the production of the original Boeing 747-400 variant. In 2009, the airline leased two Boeing 777-300ER to replace the former flagship Boeing 747-400 from GECAS. The first Boeing 777 was delivered to PAL on November 19, 2009. The airline currently has 10 777s in its fleet.

In 2019, Philippine Airlines planned to acquire the next-generation Boeing 777X to gradually replace their aging Boeing 777 fleet.

Former fleet

Fleet maintenance 
The entire Philippine Airlines fleet of Airbus and Boeing jets were formerly maintained in-house at the PAL Technical Center, which consisted of two hangars. The hangars contained an engine overhaul shop, two engine test cells, and test shops. The responsibility of maintaining the fleet, as well as all the facilities, was subsequently transferred in 2000 to Lufthansa Technik Philippines (LTP), a joint venture of Hamburg-based Lufthansa Technik AG, a leading maintenance provider in aircraft maintenance, repair and overhaul, and Macro Asia Corporation, one of the Philippines' leading providers of aviation support services and catering for foreign airlines, owned by Lucio Tan, the majority owner of PAL. LTP currently maintains an eight-bay hangar and workshops occupying  at Ninoy Aquino International Airport.

Currently all A320 including all A321 aircraft that are already delivered and those to be delivered are being maintained by Lufthansa. PAL Express is the budget arm of PAL and has overtaken PAL in 2012 in domestic seats second only to Cebu Pacific (5J).
 
On May 18, 2018, Philippine Airlines signed a deal with Lufthansa Technik Philippines to maintain its new Airbus jets for 12 years. The deal, which took effect on May 31, is estimated to be worth P13.6 billion ($260 million) during its lifespan.

References

External links 

Lists of aircraft by operator
Fleet